The Hutt by-election of 1968 was a by-election for the electorate of Hutt on 3 August 1968 during the 35th New Zealand Parliament. 

The by-election resulted from the death of the previous member and former prime minister Sir Walter Nash on 4 June 1968. The contest was won by Trevor Young, also of the Labour Party. The National candidate was John Kennedy-Good, a future Mayor of Lower Hutt, who had stood for National in the previous general election.

Background
Sir Walter Nash had represented the electorate since 1929 and was still MP at the age of 86 before dying after suffering a heart attack on 4 June 1968. Nash had already announced he intended to retire at the end of the parliamentary term and Trevor Young had already been selected as his successor in the seat to contest 1969 general election.

Candidates
Labour
The Labour Party chose Trevor Young as their candidate. Young, a longtime Labour member, had been a Lower Hutt City Councillor since 1947. As Nash was intending to retire at the upcoming general election in  Labour had already selected Young as the candidate to replace him several months earlier.

National
John Kennedy-Good was selected as the candidate of the National Party.

Social Credit
The Social Credit Party selected Tom Weal, a teacher at St Peter's College, Auckland, as their candidate.

Others
Nick Ursin, a local insurance officer, stood as an independent.

Campaign
There were allegations made of bias in television coverage of the election. John Mathison, Labour MP for Avon, made a speech in parliament where he criticised the state-owned and operated New Zealand Broadcasting Corporation (NZBC) running a nationwide news programme featuring coverage of Prime Minister Keith Holyoake and the National candidate John Kennedy-Good. However, the programme did not feature any footage of Leader of the Opposition Norman Kirk and Labour candidate Trevor Young who held a meeting on that same day. Holyoake rejected the criticism and stated that the NZBC were under time constraints, which led them to omit filming the Labour meeting. Social Credit leader Vernon Cracknell was critical of the failure of the media to cover the Social Credit campaign, stating he believed they should be allotted the same attention that the two main parties were.

Results
The following table gives the election results:

Aftermath
Young held the seat until its abolition in 1978. He then represented the seat of Eastern Hutt until 1990 when he retired.

Notes

References

Hutt 1968
1968 elections in New Zealand
Politics of the Wellington Region
August 1968 events in New Zealand
1960s in Wellington